Fuseini Nuhu (born 20 June 1989 in Accra, Greater Accra Region) is a Ghana football player who plays for Mekelle City FC

Career 
Nuhu began his career by AC Milan Colts Club in Tema, before which he was transferred to Real Sportive. After the relegation of his club after the 2008/2009 season, he signed with New Edubiase United, where he scored here in his first goal. In June 2011 he was transferred to Moldavian FC Sheriff Tiraspol.

Personal life
Nuhu is the brother of Alhassan Nuhu.

References

1989 births
Ghanaian footballers
Real Sportive players
New Edubiase United F.C. players
2011 African Nations Championship players
Expatriate footballers in Moldova
People from Tema
Ghanaian twins
Living people
Ghanaian Muslims
Association football forwards
Ghana international footballers
Mekelle 70 Enderta F.C. players
Ethiopian Premier League players
Ghanaian expatriate footballers
Ghanaian expatriate sportspeople in Moldova
Ghanaian expatriate sportspeople in Ethiopia
Ghana A' international footballers